Diego Aparecido Ferreira Oliveira (born 15 April 1986), commonly known as Diego, is a retired Brazilian footballer.

Career statistics

Club

Notes

References

1986 births
Living people
Brazilian footballers
Brazilian expatriate footballers
Association football goalkeepers
Tombense Futebol Clube players
Botafogo de Futebol e Regatas players
América Futebol Clube (MG) players
Vila Nova Futebol Clube players
Santa Cruz Futebol Clube players
ABC Futebol Clube players
Atlético Clube Corintians players
Vancouver Whitecaps FC players
Brazilian expatriate sportspeople in Canada
Expatriate soccer players in Canada